The 1955 Washington Senators season was the franchise's 55th in Major League Baseball. The Senators won 53 games, lost 101, and finished in eighth and last place in the American League. They were managed by Chuck Dressen and played home games at Griffith Stadium, where they draw 425,238 fans, eighth and last in the American League and 16th and last in MLB.

It was Dressen's first year as the Senators' manager, after Bucky Harris had led the 1954 club to a 66–88, sixth place finish. But in each of the latter seasons, his Dodgers were defeated by the New York Yankees in the World Series, and when Dressen decided to demand a three-year contract to return to Brooklyn for 1954, his owner, Walter O'Malley, let his 1953 contract expire. Dressen spent 1954 managing Oakland in the highly competitive Pacific Coast League, and his return to the major leagues was viewed with anticipation by some observers.

His hiring was a departure for the Senators' management and ownership. He was the first manager outside the Washington team's "family" hired during Clark Griffith's presidency, which began in 1920. Through 1954, Griffith had appointed eight different men to manage his club (with one, Harris, serving three different terms), and all had been current or former Senator players. Dressen, as a veteran National Leaguer and a high profile manager with New York ties, broke that 35-season trend.

And, though no one knew it at the time, 1955 would be a milestone for baseball in Washington when it proved to be Griffith's last season as the club's president and chief stockholder. He died at age 85 on October 27, and his nephew Calvin, who succeeded him, would move the franchise to Minneapolis–Saint Paul as the Minnesota Twins after only five seasons as the Senators' president.

Offseason
 Prior to 1955 season: Choo-Choo Coleman was signed as an amateur free agent by the Senators.

Regular season

Season standings

Record vs. opponents

Notable transactions
 May 1955: Gus Keriazakos was traded by the Senators to the Kansas City Athletics for Al Sima.
 June 7, 1955: Jim Busby was traded by the Senators to the Chicago White Sox for Bob Chakales, Clint Courtney and Johnny Groth.

Roster

Player stats

Batting

Starters by position
Note: Pos = Position; G = Games played; AB = At bats; H = Hits; Avg. = Batting average; HR = Home runs; RBI = Runs batted in

Other batters
Note: G = Games played; AB = At bats; H = Hits; Avg. = Batting average; HR = Home runs; RBI = Runs batted in

Pitching

Starting pitchers
Note: G = Games pitched; IP = Innings pitched; W = Wins; L = Losses; ERA = Earned run average; SO = Strikeouts

Other pitchers
Note: G = Games pitched; IP = Innings pitched; W = Wins; L = Losses; ERA = Earned run average; SO = Strikeouts

Relief pitchers
Note: G = Games pitched; W = Wins; L = Losses; SV = Saves; ERA = Earned run average; SO = Strikeouts

Award winners

All-Star Game
Mickey Vernon, starter, first base

Farm system

LEAGUE CHAMPIONS: Orlando

References

External links
1955 Washington Senators at Baseball-Reference
1955 Washington Senators team page at www.baseball-almanac.com
1955 Washington "Nationals" promotional film

Minnesota Twins seasons
Washington Senators season
1955 in sports in Washington, D.C.